In estimation theory, estimation of signal parameters via rotational invariant techniques (ESPRIT) is a technique to determine parameters of a mixture of sinusoids in a background noise. This technique is first proposed for frequency estimation, however, with the introduction of phased-array systems in daily use technology, it is also used for Angle of arrival estimations as well.

General description

Dividing into virtual sub-arrays 

Defining a signal vector as,

where  represents the radial frequency of -th sinusoid, a Vandermonde matrix for  number of sinusoids can be constructed, as in

The matrix  may be divided into two sets,

and

where  is an identity matrix of size . From this, we have that

Here,  is a diagonal matrix, where its diagonal elements can be written in a vector

In other words, the diagonal elements of H, are the complex exponentials with the radial frequencies of the set . Here, it is clear that H applies a rotation to the matrix . ESPRIT exploits similar rotations from the covariance matrix of the measured data.

Signal subspace estimation 

To understand the algorithm itself, let us denote R as the covariance matrix of the measured data. By computing the eigenvalue decomposition of R (via algorithms like singular value decomposition), the following can be written,

where E is a diagonal matrix that contains the eigenvalues of R, in a decreasing order. Here, by finding the eigenvalues that are higher than the variance of the noise, we can separate the orthonormal eigenvectors from U, that correspond to these eigenvalues. This can be noted as  where we kept only the first K columns.  

As similar before, we can make the following separation on S,

Solution of the invariance equation 

We can derive the following relations,

It is clear that the matrix P contains rotational information with respect to the frequency contents, such that the rotation on the first set of orthonormal eigenvectors yield to the second set. Moreover, the eigenvalues of P are equal to the diagonal elements of H. 
Therefore, by solving the following equation for P,

 

we can estimate the frequency content. To achieve this, the above equation can be solved with pseudo inverse (via Least squares) method.

To do so,  can be written.

Frequency estimation 

Finally, by finding the angles of the eigenvalues of P, one can estimate the set .

Algorithm example
A pseudo code is given below for the implementation of ESPRIT algorithm.

 function esprit(y, model_order, number_of_sources):
     m = model_order
     n = number_of_sources
     create covariance matrix R, from the noisy measurements y. Size of R will be (m-by-m).
     compute the svd of R
     [U, E, V] = svd(R)
     
     obtain the orthonormal eigenvectors corresponding to the sources
     S = U(:, 1:n)                 
       
     split the orthonormal eigenvectors in two
     S1 = S(1:m-1, :) and S2 = S(2:m, :)
                                                
     compute P via LS (MATLAB's backslash operator)
     P = S1\S2 
        
     find the angles of the eigenvalues of P
     w = angle(eig(P)) / (2*pi*elspacing)
      doa=asind(w)      %return the doa angle by taking the arcsin in degrees 
     return 'doa''

See also
Independent component analysis

References

Further reading
 .
 .

 Haardt, M., Zoltowski, M. D., Mathews, C. P., & Nossek, J. (1995, May). 2D unitary ESPRIT for efficient 2D parameter estimation. In icassp (pp. 2096-2099). IEEE.

Signal estimation
Trigonometry
Wave mechanics